is a video game music composer and guitarist. He is notable for his work in the Metal Gear Solid series.

Profile 
In 1997, his avant-garde rock band "Happy Family" released an album, "Toscco"  on Cuneiform Records in the U.S. (http://cuneiformrecords.com/bandshtml/happyfamily.html) "Happy Family" collaborated with many underground artists in Japan, New York and Europe. Afterwards Izutani began to work for major Japanese labels. He remixed (occasionally as Brent Mini) and produced the songs of many pop artists (Ayumi Hamasaki is the most famous one). In 2006, he started his personal band "DUGO", and the track "Dublin" was used in an episode in Season 3 of CSI: Miami. Dugo released the first album "Lingua Franca" from Brave Wave Productions in 2017.

Works

Video games
Metal Gear Solid: Portable Ops (2006)
Yakuza 2 (2006)
Wolf of the Battlefield: Commando 3 (2007)
Metal Gear Solid 4: Guns of the Patriots (2008)
Ninja Blade (2009)
Otomedius G (2009)
Bayonetta (2009)
Metal Gear Solid: Peace Walker (2010)
The Eye of Judgment: Legends (2010)
Otomedius Excellent (2011)
Ace Combat: Assault Horizon (2011)
Shinobi 3D (2011)
Bayonetta 2 (2014)
Bayonetta 3 (2022)

Anime
 Blassreiter (2008)

References

External links
 
 
 

Japanese composers
Japanese male composers
Japanese rock guitarists
Living people
Video game composers
Year of birth missing (living people)
20th-century Japanese guitarists
21st-century Japanese guitarists
20th-century Japanese male musicians
21st-century Japanese male musicians